Scission and Other Stories, sometimes simply Scission, is a 1985 collection of short stories by Australian author Tim Winton.

It won the 1985 Western Australian Council Literary Award, and was also 1985 Joint Winner Western Australian Premier's Book Award - Fiction.

Contents 
This was Winton's first collection of stories. There are 13 short stories:

Secrets

A Blow, a Kiss

Getting Ahead

My Father's Axe

Wake

Lantern Stalk

Thomas Awkner Floats

Wilderness

Neighbours

A Measure of Eloquence

The Oppressed

The Woman at the Well

Scission.

The stories are described as, " ... spare, jagged stories in which people struggle with change and disintegration ... These startling stories deal with men, women and children whose lives are coming apart and whose hearts are breaking. Honest, beautiful, shattering tales - vintage Winton."

Themes 
The title Scission describes the action or state of cutting or being cut, and each of the stories carries this theme, involving family, neighbours and strangers.

Awards 
1985 Western Australian Council Literary Award

1985 Joint Winner Western Australian Premier's Book Award - Fiction

See also
Blood and Water, short story collection

References

1985 short story collections
Short story collections by Tim Winton